The Hook is a 2004 French thriller film directed by Thomas Vincent, based on the novel of the same name by Donald Westlake.

Cast 
 François Cluzet - Ben Castelano
 Karin Viard - Suzy Castelano
 Bernard Giraudeau - Brice Kantor
 Anne Brochet - Lucie Kantor
 Jacques Spiesser - Kouznetov
  - The woman in pink
 Antoine Chappey - Captain Stéfanini
 Cécile Richard - Lieutenant Bandera
 Bernard Bloch - The doorman
 Bernard Blancan - The cop

References

External links 

2004 thriller films
2004 films
French thriller films
2000s French films
2000s French-language films